The 322d Air Expeditionary Group is a provisional United States Air Force unit assigned to the United States Air Forces in Europe. As a provisional unit, it may be activated or inactivated at any time.

The group appears to have been activated periodically on-order to provide support to U.S./AU activities in Africa under USAFE's Seventeenth Air Force. In 2004, elements of the group assisted the AU deployment to Sudan; Operation Odyssey Dawn for Libya 2011–12.

During World War II, the group's predecessor unit, the 322d Bombardment Group (Medium) was a B-26 Marauder bombardment group assigned to the Eighth and later Ninth Air Force.

History

322d Bombardment Group (Medium) 

Constituted as 322d Bombardment Group (Medium) on 19 June 1942. Activated on 17 July 1942 at MacDill Field, Florida, later relocating to Lakeland Army Air Field/Drane Field, Florida. Trained with Martin B-26 Marauder aircraft. Part of the group moved overseas to RAF Bury St Edmunds, England, November–December 1942; planes and crews followed, March–April 1943. Initially assigned to the Eighth Air Force. The group was assigned to the 3d Bomb Wing.

Ongoing construction at Bury St. Edmunds forced two of the group's squadrons to locate at RAF Rattlesden, and the group's aircraft did not arrive until late in March 1943. Once operational, the 322d flew two low-level bombing operations from Bury St. Edmunds. The first, on 14 May when it dispatched 12 planes for a minimum-level attack on an electrical generating plant near Ijtnuiden. This was the first operational combat mission flown by B-26s.

The second was a disastrous mission to the Netherlands on Monday, 17 May, when the group sent 11 aircraft on a similar operation from which none of the aircraft penetrating the enemy coast, returned. 60 crewmen were lost to flak and interceptors. Group morale was not improved when, on 29 May, a B-26 crashed onto the airfield killing the crew and damaging a hangar.

After these missions, the group was re-equipped and trained for medium-altitude operations for several weeks before returning to combat operations. On 13 June, the 322d moved to RAF Andrews Field in Essex.

In common with other Marauder units of the 3d Bomb Wing, the 322d was transferred to Ninth Air Force on 16 October 1943. The group attacked enemy airfields in France, Belgium, and the Netherlands attacking the principal targets but the group also attacked secondary targets such as power stations, shipyards, construction works, and marshalling yards.

On 11 December 1943 Andrews Field was attacked by the Luftwaffe but little damage was done and beginning in March 1944 the 322d bombed railway and highway bridges, oil tanks, and missile sites in preparation for the invasion of Normandy.

On 8 May 1944, one of the 322nd aircraft, nicknamed "Mild and Bitter" (serial 41-31819) became the first B-26 flying from England to complete 100 combat missions. Another B-26, "Flak Bait" (41-31773) survived to the end of hostilities with 202 missions to its credit, the only US bomber involved in combat over Europe to pass the 200 mark.

On D-Day, 6 June 1944 the 322d Bomb Group attacked coastal defences and gun batteries. Afterwards, during the Normandy campaign, the 322d pounded fuel and ammunition dumps, bridges, and road junctions, supporting the Allied offensive at Caen and the breakthrough at Saint-Lô in July.

From Andrews Field the 322d received a Distinguished Unit Citation for the period 14 May 1943 – 24 July 1944. The group moved during September 1944, transferring to Beauvais (A-61) Airfield in northern France, and aiding the drive of Third Army across France.

The 322d flew its last mission on 24 April 1945. After V-E Day, the group was assigned to occupation duty in Germany beginning in June 1945, engaging in inventorying and disassembling German Air Force equipment and facilities. Returned to Camp Kilmer, New Jersey in December 1945, and was inactivated on 15 December.

322d Bombardment Group, Light 
During the Cold War, the 322d was redesignated the 322d Bombardment Group, Light and activated in the Air Force reserve at Reading Army Airfield, Pennsylvania on 9 August 1947. The 322d was equipped with four squadrons (35th, 449th, 450th, 451st and 452d) Douglas A-20 Havocs. It was inactivated on 27 June 1949.

322d Tactical Fighter Group

The United States Air Force reactivated the unit as the 322d Fighter-Day Group at Foster Air Force Base, Texas on 1 July 1954. The 322d was assigned to Tactical Air Command as part of the 450th Fighter-Day Wing, initially as three squadron (450th, 451st, 452d) North American F-86 Sabre-equipped wing. In 1956, the group was upgraded to the North American F-100 Super Sabre and was redesignated as the 322d Tactical Fighter group. The 322d was inactivated on 1 January 1959 along with the closure of Foster Air Force Base in a budgetary economy move.

322d Air Expeditionary Group
In 2004 the 322d Air Expeditionary Group was activated as part of the United States Air Forces in Europe as an Air Expeditionary unit.

Lineage
 Constituted as the 322d Bombardment Group (Medium) on 19 June 1942
 Redesignated 322d Bombardment Group, Medium on 20 August 1943
 Inactivated on 15 December 1945
 Redesignated 322d Bombardment Group, Light
 Activated in the reserve on 9 August 1947
 Inactivated on 27 June 1949
 Redesignated as 322d Fighter-Day Group
 Activated on 1 July 1954
 Inactivated on 18 November 1957
 Redesignated 322d Tactical Airlift Group on 31 July 1985
 Converted to provisional status and redesignated 322d Air Expeditionary Group
 Activated on 1 July 2004
 Inactivated on 24 July 2004
 Activated on 20 January 2006
 Inactivated on 9 April 2006
 Activated on 20 January 2006
 Inactivated on 9 April 2006
 Activated on 21 July 2007
 Inactivated on 17 August 2007
 Activated in 2011
 Inactivated on 1 January 2012
 Activated on 20 January 2012
 Inactivated on 8 May 2012

Assignments
 III Bomber Command, 17 July 1942 – November 1942
 3d Bombardment Wing, 1 December 1942
 IX Bomber Command, 16 October 1943
 98th Combat Bombardment Wing (later 98th Bombardment Wing), 5 December 1943 – Sep 1945
 Tenth Air Force, 9 August 1947 – 27 June 1949
 United States Air Forces in Europe to activate or inactivate as needed
 Attached to Third Air Force, 1 July 2004 – 24 July 2004
 16th Air and Space Expeditionary Task Force, 20 January 2006 – 9 April 2006
 Attached to 48th Fighter Wing, 21 July 2007 – 17 August 2007
 Unknown, 2011 – 1 January 2012
 Attached to Seventeenth Air Force, 20 January 2012 – 1 April 2012
 17th Air Expeditionary Force, 1 April 2012 – 8 May 2012

Components
 449th Bombardment Squadron, 17 July 1942 – 11 December 1945; 4 October 1947 – 27 June 1949
 450th Bombardment Squadron (later 450th Fighter-Day Squadron), 17 June 1942 – 15 December 1945; 9 August 1947 – 27 June 1949; 1 July 1954 – 18 November 1957
 451st Bombardment Squadron (later 451st Fighter-Day Squadron), 17 July 1942 – 11 December 1945; 9 August 1947 – 27 June 1949; 1 July 1954 – 18 November 1957
 452d Bombardment Squadron (later 452d Fighter-Day Squadron), 17 July 1942 – 12 December 1945; 9 August 1947 – 27 June 1949; 1 July 1954 – 18 November 1957

Stations

 MacDill Field, Florida, 17 July 1942
 Drane Field, Florida, 22 September – November 1942
 RAF Bury St Edmunds (AAF-468), England c. 1 December 1942
 RAF Andrews Field (AAF-485), England January 1943
 Beauvais/Tille Airfield (A-61), France, September 1944
 Le Culot Airfield (A-89), Belgium, March 1945

 AAF Station Fritzlar, Germany, June–September 1945
 Reading Army Air Field, Pennsylvania, 9 August 1947 – 27 June 1949
 Foster Air Force Base, Texas, 1 July 1954 – 30 November 1957
 Rhein-Main Air Base, West Germany 1 January 1970 – 30 June 1975
 Air Force Base Hoedspruit, South Africa, 1 July 2004 – 24 July 2004
 Aviano Air Base, Italy, 20 January 2006 – 9 April 2006
 Bulboaca, 21 July 2007 – 17 August 2007
 Unknown, 2011 – 1 January 2012
 Souda Bay, Greece, 20 January 2012 – 8 May 2012

Aircraft
 Martin B-26 Marauder, 1942–1945
 Douglas A-20 Havoc, 1947–1949
 North American F-86 Sabre, 1954–1956
 North American F-100 Super Sabre, 1956–1959
 Lockheed C-130 Hercules (since 2003)

See also
 List of Martin B-26 Marauder operators

References

Notes
 Explanatory notes

 Citations

Bibliography

 
 
 Freeman, Roger A. (1991) The Mighty Eighth: The Colour Record. Cassell & Co. 
 
 Freeman, Roger A. (1996) The Ninth Air Force in Colour: UK and the Continent-World War Two. After the Battle 
 
 
 
 "U.S. Air Forces in Europe airlift Nigerian troops to Sudan's Darfur region", 1st Lt. Jenny Lovett, 322nd Air Expeditionary Wing Public Affairs, 28 October 2004

External links

322